McCoy–Shoemaker Farm is a historic home and farm complex located at Peters Township in Franklin County, Pennsylvania. The property includes a main house dated to the 1820s or 1830s, a  -story stone spring house and dwelling built about 1800 with frame addition, large stone end bank barn, frame wash house, stone smokehouse, and brick privy.  The main house is a two-story, five bay, "L"-shaped brick building on a fieldstone foundation.  The stone spring house may have also been used as a distillery.

It was listed on the National Register of Historic Places in 1980.

References 

Farms on the National Register of Historic Places in Pennsylvania
Houses on the National Register of Historic Places in Pennsylvania
Houses in Franklin County, Pennsylvania
National Register of Historic Places in Franklin County, Pennsylvania